Johan Siqveland (born 8 January 1974) is a Norwegian former Paralympic athlete. He won medals for Norway at the 1992 Summer Paralympics, 2002 Winter Paralympics and 2006 Winter Paralympics.

References

1974 births
Living people
Sportspeople from Stavanger
Paralympic sledge hockey players of Norway
Norwegian sledge hockey players
Swimmers at the 1992 Summer Paralympics
Paralympic bronze medalists for Norway
Paralympic silver medalists for Norway
Paralympic gold medalists for Norway
Medalists at the 1992 Summer Paralympics
Medalists at the 2002 Winter Paralympics
Medalists at the 2006 Winter Paralympics
Paralympic medalists in swimming
Paralympic swimmers of Norway
Norwegian male freestyle swimmers
S8-classified Paralympic swimmers
20th-century Norwegian people